Hoekse Sportvereniging Hoek, known as HSV Hoek, is a football club based in Hoek, Zeeland, Netherlands, that competes in the Derde Divisie.

History
The club was founded in 1950. Indian football legend Syed Abdul Rahim has appeared with the club in 1950. They have emerged as the champions of the Hoofdklasse twice in 1995–96, 2013–14 season. It is currently playing in the Third Division, the fourth tier of football in the Netherlands.

The club achieved fifth place in 2021–22 Derde Divisie.

Honours
Hoofdklasse
Winners (2): 1995–96, 2013–14

KNVB Cup
 Round of 16 (1): 2003–04

KNVB District Cup
Winners (3): 2012–13, 2014–15, 2016–17
 Runner-up (4): 1994–95, 1996–97, 2002–03, 2010–11

Recent managers

See also
List of football clubs in the Netherlands

References

External links

  

 
Association football clubs established in 1950
1950 establishments in the Netherlands
Football clubs in the Netherlands
Football clubs in Terneuzen